Jennifer Day is an American politician who served as a member of the Kansas House of Representatives representing the 48th district in Johnson County, Kansas, from June 3, 2020, to June 30, 2021. She was appointed to the seat on May 24, 2020, by Democratic Party committee members to complete the term of Democratic Rep. David Benson, who resigned. Representative Day was appointed after the Kansas Legislature adjourned the 2020 legislative session. She was sworn in on June 3, 2020, by Secretary of State Scott Schwab for a term ending in January 2021. Representative Day's legislative service started on the first day of a special legislative session called by Gov. Laura Kelly.

Representative Day co-sponsored legislation to prohibit the hiring law enforcement officers with a history of misconduct allegations and make certain law enforcement disciplinary records public. The bill was introduced into the state House of Representatives on June 3, 2020, at the start of the special session.

Representative Day resigned from the Legislature on June 30, 2021, due to a move out of her district. Johnson County Democrats picked attorney Dan Osman to complete the remaining 18 months on her term.

2021–2022 Kansas House of Representatives Committee assignments
Financial Institutions and Rural Development
Taxation
Corrections and Juvenile Justice

2019–2020 Kansas House of Representatives Committee assignments
No committees assigned

References

Living people
Democratic Party members of the Kansas House of Representatives
21st-century American politicians
21st-century American women politicians
Women state legislators in Kansas
Politicians from Overland Park, Kansas
Year of birth missing (living people)